Hawker College is a senior secondary college in the Australian Capital Territory. It caters to students completing their final two years of secondary education, and offers a wide range of curriculum choices.

Established in 1976, Hawker has a non-selective enrolment policy and caters for students from year 11 through to year 12.

History
Hawker College is located on the site of the original Kama Homestead.

Construction of Hawker College, which was undertaken at a cost of $3.3 million by Jennings Industries Ltd, began in January 1973 and was completed in December 1975. The college was formed shortly after the ACT Government developed its own education system—the new system meant that public high schools would only teach from grade 7 to 10, and that grades 11 and 12 would be completed at a separate college. Hawker was established and enrolled its first students in 1976 and the school's first Year 12 Certificates were presented in December 1977.

Campus
The college campus is located in the suburb of Hawker, Canberra. The campus is in close proximity to public ovals and local shops Faculties of the college include: library, visual and performing arts studio, professional theatre, media facilities, information technology facilities, gymnasium, fully equipped training restaurant and kitchen, training coffee shop, sports oval, tennis courts, modern laboratories and science facilities, design drawing facilities, fully equipped wood area for furniture and construction and cafeteria.

Principals
 John M Edmunds: 1976–1983
 Bill F Donovan: 1984–1991
 Sandra J Lambert: 1992–1995
 Terry R O’Keeffe: 1996–2002
 Richard Powell: 2002–2008
 Stephen Gwilliam: 2008–2012
 Peter Sollis: 2013–2015
 Frank Keighley (acting): 2015–2016
 Andy Mison: 2016–2021
 Lyndall Henman: 2022-Current

References

External links

Hawker College Home Page

Educational institutions established in 1976
High schools in the Australian Capital Territory
Public schools in the Australian Capital Territory